Dan Chen is a musician and producer living in Brooklyn, New York City. He is the owner of Stuhr Records and is one-half of the production duo Stuhr.

Chen was a principal songwriter with the band Moonraker from 1998–2004, the keyboardist for Mike Doughty's Band from 2005–2006, and again in 2011, and keyboardist and back-up vocalist in Nicole Atkins & The Sea from 2006–2009.  He performed, engineered, and co-wrote two songs on Nicole Atkins' 2011 album Mondo Amore.

Chen is one-half of the production duo Stuhr, whose remixes have appeared on Bebel Gilberto Remixed, Oscillate Records Vol.1, Rock River's Christmas Remixed, and Buddha Bar VII. Stuhr co-wrote and produced Natalie Walker's debut album, Urban Angel (August 2007), as well as the follow-up, With You (July 2009), both of which were released on Dorado Records.

Chen's music has also been widely used on many television shows including Bones, Entourage, Dancelife, One Tree Hill, Ugly Betty, Smallville, ER and Grey's Anatomy.

Chen grew up in Oakville, Ontario, a suburb of Toronto, and studied classical piano until high school.  He then switched to playing guitar and bass in various local bands.  Later, while attending the University of Toronto, he returned to playing keyboards, spending most of his free time touring with a Toronto blues band.  After transferring to Berklee College of Music, he graduated in 2003 with a degree in Contemporary Writing & Production.  He currently works as a music producer at Serious Business studios, as well as at his own private studio in Brooklyn.

References

External links
 Official site
  Serious Business staff

Year of birth missing (living people)
Place of birth missing (living people)
Living people
Canadian record producers
Canadian indie rock musicians
Canadian songwriters
People from Oakville, Ontario
Berklee College of Music alumni
University of Toronto alumni
Canadian keyboardists
Writers from Brooklyn